The Verde Azzurro path, or "Blue trail" is a hiking route that runs entirely within the Cinque Terre National Park, a UNESCO World Heritage Site, primarily connecting the five main villages.

Currently listed as route 592, it is commonly referred to as Trail SVA2, the former path number of the CAI of La Spezia. The path has historically been used by the local inhabitants to travel on foot between the villages of the park.

Route 
The maximum altitude is reached in Prevo, a tiny hamlet of Vernazza, at about  asl. It takes over 5 hours of walking to cover it entirely and can be considered divided into four distinct sections.

 592-1 (SVA2): The first stretch, between Riomaggiore and Manarola, is better known as Via dell'Amore.
This section is rated as easy.
This section is rated as moderate to difficult.
This section is rated as moderate to difficult.

Visitation and Trekking Card 
It is one of the most popular hiking routes in the area, and the only trail in the national park requiring a fee. Along the route, there are checkpoints for the Cinque Terre Trekking Card, a hiking permit instituted in 2001 by the park authority. The card is aimed at allowing the use of the services provided by the Cinque Terre National Park Authority and constitutes a sort of self-financing. The proceeds of the Cinque Terre Cards are mainly used to upkeep and restore the territory, as well as to provide transport services within the territory. The card is purchasable online as well as at any of the welcome centers found in the park.

Closures 
Due to the unstable nature of the land in this area, frequent landslides result in regular trail closures. The park authorities recommend all visitors to check the status of trails prior to beginning any treks through the park.

Since fall of 2019, the popular Via dell'Amore segment has been closed due to renovations to the trail, and is expected to reopen in spring 2023.

See also 

 Cinque Terre
 Club Alpino Italiano

References 

Hiking trails in Italy
Parks in Liguria